Conor Gethins (born 1 November 1983) is an Irish footballer who plays as a forward for Scottish Highland Football League Club Nairn County.

Career
Born in Lifford, Ireland, Gethins started his professional career with Ross County in the Scottish Football League before returning to his native Ireland in 2005 after a loan spell with Stirling Albion. Gethins played for Finn Harps in the League of Ireland, with a brief loan spell at Galway United, before returning to Scottish football in 2010 with Peterhead. He signed for Nairn County in 2011 and was voted Highland League Player of the Year and top scorer for 2012–13.

On 1 June 2016 Gethins join Formartine United, on a two-year contract.

At the end of the 2020–21 season, Gethins was released from Formartine and rejoined previous club Nairn County on a one-year contract.

References

External links

Conor Gethins at Nairn County Archive

1983 births
Living people
Association footballers from County Donegal
Ross County F.C. players
Stirling Albion F.C. players
Finn Harps F.C. players
Galway United F.C. (1937–2011) players
Peterhead F.C. players
Nairn County F.C. players
Scottish Football League players
League of Ireland players
Republic of Ireland association footballers
Association football forwards
Forfar Athletic F.C. players
Formartine United F.C. players
Highland Football League players